Pipestone Municipal Airport  is a city-owned public-use airport located one mile southeast of the central business district of Pipestone, a city in Pipestone County, Minnesota, United States.

Facilities and aircraft 
For the 12-month period ending August 31, 2016, the airport had 8,200 aircraft operations, an average of 22 per day: 99% general aviation and less than 1% military. In March 2017, there were 17 aircraft based at this airport: all 17 single-engine.

References

External links 
 

Airports in Minnesota
Buildings and structures in Pipestone County, Minnesota
Transportation in Pipestone County, Minnesota